Arsha Vidya Gurukulam  is a set of Vedic teaching institutions founded by Swami Dayananda Saraswati (1930 – 2015). A gurukulam is a center for residential learning that evolved from the Vedic tradition. Arsha Vidya translates to knowledge of rishis (sages).

Its current president is Swami Viditatmananda Saraswati (born 1940). Its three main centers in India are the Swami Dayananda Ashram in Rishikesh, the Adhyatma Vidya Mandir in Ahmedabad, and the Arsha Vidya Gurukulam in Coimbatore. In the United States, its main center is the Arsha Vidya Pitham in Saylorsburg, Pennsylvania, about ninety miles west of New York City. As of 2008, it had approximately sixty other centers worldwide.

In 2016, the Los Angeles Times published a critical review of Gurukulam: One Without a Second, a documentary featuring residents and teachers of the Arsha Vidya Gurukulam  in Tamil Nadu, India.

Study 
Since its formation, the Arsha Vidya Gurukulam provides an academic-like environment to focus on study of Advaita Vedanta, Sanskrit, the Vedas and ancient Sanskrit texts. Over time, the institutes have broadened the scope of their libraries and curriculum to also include a number of traditional Indian disciplines. Some of the added disciplines include hatha yoga and meditation, as well as ayurveda and astrology.

Courses range in duration from a single-weekend to three years, and instruction is in English, though advanced students study the original texts in Sanskrit.

Institutions
Arsha Vidya Gurukulam has two main teaching centers: The Saylorsburg campus was established in 1986, and the Coimbatore center was founded in 1990:

Arsha Vidya Gurukulam, P.O. Box 1059, Saylorsburg, Pennsylvania 18353, USA
Arsha Vidya Gurukulam, Anaikatti, Coimbatore – 641108, Tamil Nadu, India

The traditional teaching centers carry the banner Arsha Vidya or Arsha Vijnana (i.e., Knowledge of the Rishis). There is one more gurukulam in Maharashtra, located on the western half of India:

Arsha Vijnana Gurukulam, Amravati Road, Nagpur, Maharashtra, 410 033, India

The word Arsha has also been used by many of Swami Dayananda's students in naming their facilities to mark their lineage. A 2012 estimate found there were at least sixty centers in India and abroad that carry on the tradition of Vedantic teaching under the banner of Arsha Vidya.

In 2017, the lineage of teachers convened at their annual Rishikesh meetup and discussed the need to create a hub to organize the sampradaya (i.e., tradition). To that end, they have created the Arsha Vidya Sampradaya, which provides access to information maintains a directory of Arsha Vidya teachers.

Ashram
Arsha Vidya Pitham, also known as the Swami Dayananda Ashram is situated in  Rishikesh across multiple acres of land. The ashram facilities include a bookstore, modern facilities for dining, as well as a 250 person lecture hall. It also maintains a library with over 5,000 titles on grammar and philosophy and the personal collections of Swami Dayananda Saraswati himself.

The ashram exists on the grounds that have been around since as early as 1967. It was in 1982 that the ashram was expanded and officially named the Arsha Vidya Pitham.

It also runs a publication house, Sri Gangadhareswar Trust that produces books on Vedanta, Hinduism, Hindu philosophy and literature, Paninian grammar, Indian history and related subjects.

It houses the temple of Gangadhareswar, a shrine situated close to the Ganges dedicated to Lord Shiva.

After the Swami's mahāsamādhi (i.e., death) in 2015, a shrine was built at the ashram, containing Dayanandesvara, a consecrated lingam for devotees, as well as the form of the Swami rendered into a statue.

Several students and sanyassis (renunciates) who have studied at the centres, have gone on to spread Dayananda's teachings elsewhere and some have established ashrams of their own.

Programs
These residential centers conduct long-term courses, 1–2-week camps, weekend study programs and family camps throughout the year. Subjects covered include the major Upanishads, Bhagavad Gita, several secondary texts of Vedanta and the Brahma Sutras. The study includes also the Sanskrit commentary of Sankara on these texts. Along with these studies, the Sanskrit language is also taught with Paninian grammar. The Gurukulas also conduct sessions of daily meditation and satsangas. Additionally camps are conducted for teaching Yoga, Indian Classical Music, Ayurveda, Jyotisha and allied disciplines.

The teaching centers conduct outreach programs to reach out to the public at large.

See also
 Gurukulam (film)

References

External links 
 Arsha Vidya Gurukulam  Tamil Nadu
 Arsha Vidya Gurukulam  Pennsylvania
 Arsha Vidya Pitham, Rishikesh  Uttarakhand
 Arsha Vidya Sampradaya, index of Arsha Vidya teachers and alumni. Run by Swami Dayananda Ashram.
 Arsha Vijnana Gurukulam Maharashtra
 AVG Sanskrit

Arsha Vidya Gurukulam schools
Asian-American culture in Pennsylvania
Hindu schools in the United States
Indian-American culture
Religious schools in Pennsylvania